Giorgos Kavazis (born 15 January 1980) is a retired Cypriot footballer who played as a striker.

References

1980 births
Living people
Cypriot footballers
Apollon Limassol FC players
AEK Athens F.C. players
Kalamata F.C. players
Ethnikos Asteras F.C. players
Agios Dimitrios F.C. players
AEL Limassol players
Cypriot First Division players
Super League Greece players
Association football forwards
Cyprus under-21 international footballers
Cypriot expatriate footballers
Expatriate footballers in Greece
Cypriot expatriate sportspeople in Greece